Ethel Reschke (24 April 1911 – 5 June 1992) was a German actress. She appeared in more than 70 films and television shows between 1931 and 1977.

Selected filmography

 Mädchen in Uniform (1931)
 Paul and Pauline (1936)
 By a Silken Thread (1938)
  Who's Kissing Madeleine? (1939)
 In the Name of the People (1939)
 The Three Codonas (1940)
 The Unfaithful Eckehart (1940)
 Romance in a Minor Key (1943)
 Große Freiheit Nr. 7 (1944)
 Don't Play with Love (1949)
 Queen of the Night (1951)
 Don't Ask My Heart (1952)
 My Wife Is Being Stupid (1952)
 Three Days of Fear (1952)
 The Colourful Dream (1952)
 The Chaste Libertine (1952)
 The Rose of Stamboul (1953)
 The Uncle from America (1953)
 Christina (1953)
 Dutch Girl (1953)
 The Golden Plague (1954)
 My Aunt, Your Aunt (1956)
 The Captain from Köpenick (1956)
 Between Munich and St. Pauli (1957)
 Candidates for Marriage (1958)
 We Cellar Children (1960)
 Jeder stirbt für sich allein (1962, TV film)
  (1963, TV miniseries)

References

External links

1911 births
1992 deaths
German film actresses
People from Lębork